Ralls is a city in Crosby County, Texas, United States. It was named after John Robinson Ralls, who with the help of W.E. McLaughlin, laid out the townsite in July 1911. As of the 2010 census, it had a population of 1,944, down from 2,252 at the 2000 census. Ralls is surrounded by productive farm lands that primarily produce cotton and grains, with lesser amounts of soybean, sunflower seed, and vegetables.

Geography
Ralls is an agricultural community located on the level plains of the Llano Estacado between Lorenzo to the west and Crosbyton to the east. To the north of Ralls is the small community of Cone, and further north is a narrow portion of Blanco Canyon, where the Spanish explorer Francisco Vázquez de Coronado and his army are believed to have camped in 1541. To the south of Ralls is the Caprock Escarpment, which marks the break between the Llano Estacado and the Rolling Plains, carved by tributaries of the Brazos River, such as the Salt Fork and the Double Mountain Fork.

Demographics

2020 census

As of the 2020 United States census, there were 1,665 people, 685 households, and 423 families residing in the city.

2000 census
Ralls is part of the Lubbock Metropolitan Statistical Area. According to the United States Census Bureau, the population was 2,252 in 2000, with 776 households, and 584 families residing in the community. The population density was 1,680.4 people per square mile (648.9/km). The 871 housing units averaged 649.9 per square mile (251.0/km). The racial makeup of the city was 58.48% White, 2.22% African American, 0.53% Native American, 36.77% from other races, and 2.00% from two or more races. Hispanics or Latinos of any race were 55.77% of the population.

Of the 776 households, 38.7% had children under the age of 18 living with them, 57.6% were married couples living together, 13.4% had a female householder with no husband present, and 24.7% were not families. About 22.6% of all households were made up of individuals, and 15.2% had someone living alone who was 65 years of age or older. The average household size was 2.86 and the average family size was 3.37.

In the city, the population was distributed as 32.7% under the age of 18, 7.8% from 18 to 24, 23.9% from 25 to 44, 18.6% from 45 to 64, and 16.9% who were 65 years of age or older. The median age was 33 years. For every 100 females, there were 87.4 males. For every 100 females age 18 and over, there were 80.8 males.

The median income for a household in the city was $23,892, and for a family was $26,739. Males had a median income of $23,750 versus $15,724 for females. The per capita income for the city was $10,557. About 25.3% of families and 28.6% of the population were below the poverty line, including 34.8% of those under age 18 and 27.2% of those age 65 or over.

Notable people
 Billy Walker, country musician, and member of the Grand Ole Opry, was born in Ralls
 Hal Bynum, country music songwriter, was born in Ralls
 Jubal Clark, country music singer songwriter and actor, was born in Ralls

Education
The city is served by the Ralls Independent School District.

See also
Canyon Valley, Texas
Estacado, Texas
Mount Blanco

References

Notes

External links

Cities in Crosby County, Texas
Cities in Texas